Lambsburg is an unincorporated community in Carroll County, Virginia, United States. Lambsburg has a post office with ZIP code 24351. The community of Lambsburg Virginia has been around for a couple of hundred years. It was there when Hardin Taliaferro, pronounced "Tolliver" was growing up on Little Fish River in the 1820s: just across the state line in Surry County, North Carolina. Lambsburg was then called "The Hawks Settlement": later called Rocksburg, and still, later, it became Lambsburg.

Lambsburg is located in the southern part of Carroll County, near the North Carolina state line, in a basin on the headwaters of Stewart’s Creek, between Fisher’s Peak on the west and the Sugar Loaf Mountain on the East. Throughout the years and over and behind the community, a mountain looms large above known as the Sugar Loaf or Sugarloaf.  Like other mountains throughout the world by the same name, its name may come by way of the form of the peak which resembles a "sugarloaf" (Allaby, 2010).  The name Sugarloaf was coined in the 16th century by the Portuguese during the zenith of sugarcane trade in Brazil. According to historian Vieira Fazenda, blocks of sugar were placed in conical molds made of clay to be transported on ships and formed a loaf shape. 

The community of Lambsburg was named for J C Hugh Lamb who moved here from Guilford County, NC around 1860 and purchased about 500 acres of land on Stewart’s Creek. His wife Mariam A Lamb was the first postmaster of the post office established there in 1866. The post office was in the home. The area was very thinly populated. Mt Airy, NC was a small community, and Galax, VA did not exist until 50 years later. The mail was carried on horseback from Mt Airy to Lambsburg and from Lambsburg to Old Town, west of where Galax is now located.  Mr. Lamb was a very progressive person. He is said to have built the first schoolhouse in Lambsburg and at his own expense, hired Fannie Kingsbury to teach in the one-room log building. He was also credited with building the first church, with services held by Rev. Eli Whittington, a Methodist minister from Guilford County, NC.  Stewart’s Creek received its name from the Stuart families who settled there, or received early land grants on the creek: among which was John Stewart (1787) father-in-law of Abraham Hawks; Charles Stuart (1810) married Lucy Collins, sister to Chap Collins, and Archibald Stuart (1883) father of General Jeb Stuart. 

Another prominent mountain in the background landscape of Lambsburg is Fisher's Peak.  Fisher’s Peak is said to be named after a member of the survey party of Jefferson and Frye when they were establishing the North Carolina/Virginia state line. Hot and exhausted after climbing the mountain, Mr. Fisher is said to have drunk too much cold water from a spring on the Peak and died there. This spring is the head of Fisher’s River (Little Fish River) which flows south about four miles west of Lambsburg.  In current day, Fisher's Peak is the home of broadcasting transmitters and antennas such as for WBRF, 98.1 FM station. 

The Flower (Flour) Gap Trail, passing through Lambsburg, is the oldest North/South road traversing Carroll County. Flour and grain from the mills on the Yadkin River in North Carolina were hauled in wagons to the mining areas at Austinville (in Carroll County) where it was exchanged for pig iron and lead. This road was later abandoned in favor of Piper’s Gap Road, which was named after the surveyor of the road.

Lambsburg had its first heyday during the latter half of the 19th century. An 1885 map of Carroll County by the USGS Survey indicates that the Lambsburg/Aaron section was the most populated area in the county, with the exception of Hillsville. Located mid-way between the two nearest railheads at Roanoke and Winston Salem, it developed into an important trading center: with five large mercantile businesses operated by Daniel Carlan, (general merchandise) Orvil Hawks, (shoes) Friel Hawks, (feed and groceries) Osborne Hawks, (specializing in canned goods) and Billy Hawks, (retail and wholesale whiskey, fruits and farm products.) John C Lamb operated a gun factory. Groug Kingsbury had a cabinet shop where he made coffins and household furniture. Three Government distilleries were in operation by Billy Hawks, Friel Hawks, and Daniel Carlan. Whiskey was hauled to the railheads and shipped to other states.  Osborne Hawks operated a large cannery and hauled or shipped his products to other communities or towns. A campground with a blacksmith shop operated by Levi Blackburn for repairing wagons and re-tiring wagon wheels served people who came from far distances in wagon trains to do their shopping in Lambsburg.

A male and female academy was built on land donated by Friel Hawks in 1893. Cabel Hawks was the principal. Prof. J A Thompson, Prof. Brown, and Minnie Hawks Boyles were the teachers. Mrs. Boyles taught the girls in a separate room.  Plans were made to build a railroad from Roanoke to Winston Salem, where it would connect with the Yadkin Valley Railroad. By 1890, the N & W Railway Company had surveyed and purchased a right-of-way through Carroll County, which included a Lambsburg Depot, a 34.5-acre rail yard, and a staging area near the NC/VA state line. A building constructed by N & W still stands on the site but is now used as a residence.  Hard times came and the railroad was never finished. It stopped at Anderson Bottoms and the railroad company laid out a town which they named “Bonapart.” The first shipment from the town was a carload of Galax leaves by Woodruff Company of Low Gap. As a result, they changed the name to Galax and it was incorporated in 1906.

The railhead at Galax had an adverse effect on the businesses at Lambsburg. Wagon trains no longer came there to do their shopping and businesses suffered. In 1910, the Lambsburg Male and Female Academy burned down and the community educational system suffered. In 1918, the eighteenth amendment came into effect and the sale of liquor was illegal. Billy Hawks, who owned the only remaining government distillery was required to cease operation, and another thriving business bit the dust. The hands of Providence had dealt harshly with Lambsburg. It was no longer a thriving business and education center. The turning wheel of history had passed it for the time being.

In the 1960s and early 1970s, the community of Lambsburg was intersected by an Interstate in the Eisenhower Interstate system known as I-77.   The real estate for the Interstate section at Exit 1 was procured from the family of Marcus Fayette Edwards (b.1897- d.1971) and Nancy Payne Edwards (b.1899 - d.1963) who owned several hundred acres of land at the time.  Marcus had purchased the land in the late 1920s after working for a while in the coal mines of West Virginia before settling back in the Lambsburg community, a place he had known earlier in life perhaps being born there. 

For many years, no development came to the area in terms of larger commercial enterprises.  Several small businesses are and have been in operation at various times.  In recent years, a Love’s Travel Stop & Country Store opened in 2012 and a Dollar General store in January 2019.

References

4. Wayne Easter, Local Historian; Facebook post December 2016 for some of the history before 1920 

5. Allaby, Michael (2010). A Dictionary of Ecology (4th ed.). Oxford University Press. p. 53. .

Unincorporated communities in Carroll County, Virginia
Unincorporated communities in Virginia